North Koroba Rural LLG a local-level government (LLG) of Koroba-Kopiago District in Hela Province, Papua New Guinea.

Wards
01. Kelabo 1
02. Kelabo 2
03. Kudjebi
04. Hawinda
05. Aienda
06. Kagoma
07. Warukumu
08. Kenamo
09. Piangonga 2
10. Piangoga 1
11. Jakuabi
12. Levani
13. Betege 2
14. Ereiba 2
15. Ereiba 1
16. Kereneiba
17. Betege 1
18. Hujanoma 2
19. Hujanoma 1
20. Teria 2
21. Teria 1
22. Yatemali
23. Yaluba 1
24. Yaluba 2
25. Umimi
26. Topi

References 

Local-level governments of Hela Province